New Boston High School is a public high school located in New Boston, Texas (USA) and classified as a 3A school by the UIL. It is part of the New Boston Independent School District located in central Bowie County. In 2015, the school was rated "Met Standard" by the Texas Education Agency.

Academics
UIL Journalism Champions - 
2008(2A), 2011(2A)

Athletics

The New Boston Lions compete in these sports - 

Baseball
Basketball
Cross Country
Football
Golf
Powerlifting
Softball
Tennis
Track and Field
Volleyball

State Titles
Boys' Basketball - 
1984(3A)
Boys' Track - 
1958(1A)

Notable alumni
Jeff Gladney, football player
Devin the Dude, American rapper, 1988

References

External links

New Boston ISD

Schools in Bowie County, Texas
Public high schools in Texas